Donna Eberhart-Phillips is a geologist known for her research on subduction zones, especially in Alaska and New Zealand.

Education and career 

Eberhart-Phillips earned her Ph.D. in 1989 from Stanford University where she worked on the tectonic processes in California. As of 2021, Eberhart-Phillips has joint appointments at the University of California, Davies and GNS Science in Dunedin, New Zealand.

In 2018, Eberhart-Phillips was named a fellow of the American Geophysical Union who cited her "for fundamental contributions to the seismotectonic analysis of subduction zones and fault zones and innovations in seismic tomography."

Research 

Eberhart-Phillips uses seismic data to examine earthquakes in subduction zones in New Zealand, Alaska where she worked on the 2002 Denali earthquake, and California where she worked on the 1992 Landers earthquake. In California, Eberhart-Phillips works on changes in the seismic waves from earthquakes from the Hayward Fault Zone as they move through the delta where the Sacramento and San Joaquin reach the sea.

Selected publications

Awards and honors 
 Fellow, American Geophysical Union (2018)

References

External links 
 

Fellows of the American Geophysical Union
Stanford University alumni
University of California, Davis faculty
Living people
Women geologists
Year of birth missing (living people)